Neocaridina palmata is a freshwater shrimp found in China and Vietnam. It is found in rivers, streams and ponds. Their preferred habitat is heavily planted, slow flowing water.

Subspecies
There are 4 subspecies:
Neocaridina palmata bosensis (Cai, 1996)
Neocaridina palmata luodianica (Liang, 2004)
Neocaridina palmata meridionalis (Liang, 2004)
Neocaridina palmata palmata (Shen, 1948)

Status
This species is considered to be abundant and stable, and thus is listed as Least Concern by the IUCN. No specific current threats were defined for this species.

Human interaction
For local villages, these shrimps can have a high economic value. This is attributed to high population densities and fast reproduction rates, especially in mountain streams.

References

Atyidae
Freshwater crustaceans of Asia
Crustaceans described in 1948